Svartnuten is a mountain in Sel Municipality in Innlandet county, Norway. The mountain is surrounded by several other notable mountains including Vinjeronden and Rondeslottet to the northeast, Storronden and Rondvasshøgde to the east, Simlepiggen to the southeast, Steet and Hoggbeitet to the west, and Veslesmeden to the northwest.

See also
List of mountains of Norway by height

References

Sel
Mountains of Innlandet